The Greater Manchester Open was a professional golf tournament which was played annually from 1975 to 1981. It was a European Tour event from 1976. It was held at Wilmslow Golf Club in Wilmslow, Cheshire, just to the south of Manchester. Three of the six winners were from the Republic of Ireland, and a fourth, Mark McNulty, became an Irish citizen many years later. In 1981 the prize fund was £40,000, which was the third smallest on the European Tour that season.

Winners

Notes

References

External links
Coverage on the European Tour's official site

Former European Tour events
Golf tournaments in England
Sport in Cheshire
1975 establishments in England
1981 disestablishments in England
Defunct sports competitions in England